The coat of arms of the Autonomous Republic of Adjara is a shield divided in two by a wavy line. In the center is a red smaller shield of the Lesser Arms of Georgia, bearing a silver horseman (St. George) with a golden halo mounted on a silver horse and slaying a silver dragon with a golden-tipped, silver-shafted spear. The upper sector of the main shield bears a golden fortress on a green field and the lower one contains three golden coins on blue field. 
 
The coat of arms was adopted by the Supreme Council of Adjara in 2008. Its use is regulated by the Constitution of Adjara and the republic's special law.

See also 
Flag of Adjara

References 

Adjara
Adjara
Adjara
Adjara
Adjara
Adjara
Adjara